Serge Sauvion (1929–2010) was a French actor.

He was the French voice of Peter Falk as Columbo.

Selected filmography 
 The Law of Men (1962)
 Thank You, Natercia (1963)
 Julien Fontanes, magistrat (1980–81)
 Signes extérieurs de richesse (1983)

1929 births
2010 deaths
French male film actors
Male actors from Paris
French male voice actors
French male television actors